Sagan-Nur (Sagaan Nuur) is a rural locality (a selo) in Mukhorshibirsky District, Republic of Buryatia, Russia. The population was 3,985 as of 2017. There are 56 streets.

Geography 
Sagan-Nur is located 73 km northeast of Mukhorshibir (the district's administrative centre) by road. Kusoty is the nearest rural locality.

References 

Rural localities in Mukhorshibirsky District